Sanchita Luitel is a Nepalese film actress.

Filmography

References

External links
 

Living people
Actors from Kathmandu
21st-century Nepalese actresses
Nepalese film actresses
Bahun
Year of birth missing (living people)